Panin, or Panina (feminine; Па́нина) is a Russian surname.

"Panin" may refer to:

Members of a noble Panin family
Count Nikita Ivanovich Panin
Count Petr Ivanovich Panin
Count Nikita Petrovich Panin
Count Alexander Panin
Count Viktor Nikitich Panin, a Russian statesman
General Count Petr Ivanovich Panin
Count Gerard Panin
Adam Panin
Aleksei Panin (born 1977), Russian actor
Andrey Panin (1962–2013), Russian actor and director
Boris Panin (1848–1917), Prime Minister
Gennady Panin (born 1981), Russian politician
Ivan Panin (1855–1942)
Ivan Panin (mathematician) (born 1959), Russian mathematician
Nikita Fyodorovich Panin († 1652)
Nikolai Panin (1872–1956), Russian figure skater and Olympic champion
 (1909–1943), a Soviet aircraft pilot and Hero of the Soviet Union
Stepan Panin
Vasily Panin

"Panina" may refer to:
Countess Sofia Panina (1871–1956), philanthropist and Kadet Party politician
Valentina Panina, a Russian actress. 
Varya Panina (Varvara Panina, Varja Panina), (1872 – May 28, 1911), A famous Russian Gypsy romance singer of the beginning of the 20th century 
Several people called Natalya Panina

Other uses 
Michman Panin, a 1960 Soviet military drama film
Vera Panina, a 1918 German film by Urban Gad 

Russian noble families